Music, Romance and Especially Love is an album by American jazz drummer Louis Bellson featuring performances recorded in 1957 for the Verve label.

Reception
Allmusic awarded the album 3 stars.

Track listing
 "Feather's Nest" (Ernie Wilkins)
 "Ting-a-Ling" (Louie Bellson, Charlie Shavers)
 "The Best Days"
 "Hamer's Hang Up" (Wilkins)
 "Music Romance and Especially Love" (Bellson, Sam H. Stept)
 "Delightfully Yours" 
 "Escapade" (Juan Tizol)
 "Undecided"
 "Mambo Portofino" (Bellson)
 "Caravan" (Tizol)
 "Over We Go" (Bellson)
 "Cire's Thought"
Recorded in Los Angeles, CA on July 24, 1957 (tracks 1-6) and July 25, 1957 (tracks 7-12)

Personnel
Louis Bellson – drums
Harry Edison - trumpet
Juan Tizol - valve trombone
Willie Smith - alto saxophone
Buddy Collette - tenor saxophone, flute
Bob Poland - baritone saxophone
Jimmy Rowles - piano
Red Mitchell – bass

References

Verve Records albums
Louie Bellson albums
1958 albums
Albums produced by Norman Granz